The 1994 Individual Speedway Junior World Championship was the 18th edition of the World motorcycle speedway Under-21 Championships. The event was won by Mikael Karlsson of Sweden and he also gained qualification to 1995 Speedway Grand Prix.

World final
August 14, 1994
 Varhaug, Elgane Motorsykkelklubb

References

1994
World I J
1994 in Norwegian sport
Speedway competitions in Norway